The 2022 Valencia Marathon was a Elite Platinum Label marathon race held in Valencia, Spain on December 3, 2022. It was the 42nd running of the race.

Results 
23-year old Kenyan Kelvin Kiptum, in his marathon debut, won the elite men's title by 2:01:53, and set a new course record.

Amane Beriso, who has won the elite women's title by 2:14:58, also smashed the previous course record. She is now ranked third in the women's marathon all-time top list.

References 

Valencia
2022 in Spanish sport